David Bryant (born 4 January 1989) is an elite Australian triathlete with a disability. He represented Australia at the 2020 Summer Paralympics.

Personal
Byant was born on 4 January 1989. He was born with a clubfoot in his right leg which sees him compete with a muscle mass differential of approximately 17% less than that of his left leg. He is an Accredited Practising Dietitian and Advanced Sports Dietitian. He has worked as a personal trainer. In 2021, he lives in Perth.

Career
In 2019, Bryant was categorised in para triathlon as PTS5.

Bryant competed at the 2020 Summer Paralympics in PTS5 and finished seventh with a time of 1:02.30.

Major results: 2019 Devonport ITU Paratriathlon World Cup - PTS5 Men - 1st
2019 AUS Paratriathlon National Championships - PTS5 Men - 1st
2019 Besancon ITU Paratriathlon World Cup - PTS5 Men - 2nd
2019 Tokyo ITU Paratriathlon World Cup - PTS5 Men - 5th
2019 ITU World Triathlon Grand Final Lausanne - PTS5 Men - 8th
2019 Alanya ITU Paratriathlon World Cup - PTS5 Men - 2nd
2020 Newcastle OTU Paratriathlon Oceania Championships - PTS5 Men - 1st
2020 Devonport ITU World Paratriathlon Series - PTS5 Men - 2nd
2021 Tokyo Paralympic Games - PTS5 - 7th

In 2021, he was a Western Australian Institute of Sport scholarship athlete.

References

External links

World Triathlon Profile

1989 births
Living people
Australian male triathletes
Paratriathletes of Australia
Paratriathletes at the 2020 Summer Paralympics
20th-century Australian people
21st-century Australian people